An Australian Girl (1890) is a novel by Australian author Catherine Edith Macauley Martin, published under her pseudonym "Mrs. Alick Macleod". The book was originally published in three volumes of 331, 345 and 339 pages, though later editions abridged the text to 474 pages.

Book summary

The novel is set in Australia and Europe in the 1880s.  The story follows the early life of Stella Courtland, who, feeling herself unable to marry an Anglo-German intellectual Anselm Langdale, instead marries a long-term suitor who she later discovers is an alcoholic. She also discovers that Langdale is not already married as she originally thought. Following a breakdown and consideration of leaving her husband she finally decides to honour her marriage and stand by him.

Reviews

Writing in The Advertiser (Adelaide) at the time of the book's publication, a reviewer, while finding some padding in the work, stated: "The author may be congratulated on the composition of a highly ingenious story told with considerable force and pathos. It has the merit of freshness of scene and novelty of character, the localities and the scenery described in it being for the most part South Australian."

The Sydney Mail reviewer was also equivocal but saw promise: "With a little more accuracy and a good deal less philosophy we see no reason why this writer, who is apparently a "new hand," should not at the next attempt produce a really readable novel. There are passages by no means wanting in power, and when the principal characters get off their stilts and talk like ordinary mortals the dialogue is easy and natural."

References

External links
 An Australian Girl Setis text - 1891 2nd edition

1890 Australian novels
Novels set in South Australia